Energy-dispersive X-ray diffraction (EDXRD) is an analytical technique for characterizing materials. It differs from conventional X-ray diffraction by using polychromatic photons as the source and is usually operated at a fixed angle. With no need for a goniometer, EDXRD is able to collect full diffraction patterns very quickly. EDXRD is almost exclusively used with synchrotron radiation which allows for measurement within real engineering materials.

History 
EDXRD was originally proposed independently by Buras et al. and Giessen and Gordon in 1968.

Advantages 
The advantages of EDXRD are (1) it uses a fixed scattering angle, (2) it works directly in reciprocal space, (3) fast collection time, and (4) parallel data collection. The fixed scattering angle geometry makes EDXRD especially suitable for in situ studies in special environments (e.g. under very low or high temperatures and/or pressures). When the EDXRD method is used, only one entrance and one exit window are needed. The fixed scattering angle also allows for measurement of the diffraction vector directly. This allows for high-accuracy measurement of lattice parameters. It allows for rapid structure analysis and the ability to study materials that are unstable and only exist for short periods of time. Because the whole spectrum of diffracted radiation is obtained simultaneously, it enables parallel data collection studies where structural changes can be determined over time.

Facilities

References

 
Diffraction
Synchrotron-related techniques